French Division 3 may refer to:

 Championnat National (1993–present), current third tier of the French football pyramid
 French Division 3 (1971–1993), former third tier of the French football pyramid
 , single season of French third-tier football

See also 

 French Division 4 (disambiguation)